Antoni Solé  is a Spanish film & TV producer, showrunner, writer and director.

Biography
He started his career as a film producer in 2001, some of his movies where in Competition in Cannes Film Festival, Berlin International Film Festival and Venezia.
He wrote the script and direct the second unit in the action drama Alpha. directed by Joan Cutrina and produced by Genco Films and Zip Films in 2012.
With the short movie thriller film You are a terrorist. made his director debut with a very controversial short film about media manipulation in the so-called "war against terrorism".
In 2014 he wrote the script and direct the supernatural thriller Foe.

Personal life
He is one of the most important collectors in the world of items related to Russian cellist Daniil Shafran.

References

External links
 
 
 http://www.foe-movie.com
 http://www.youareaterroristmovie.com
https://www.linkedin.com/in/antoni-sol%C3%A9-320997211/

1974 births
Living people
Spanish film directors
Writers from Barcelona
Spanish film producers
Spanish art directors
Spanish male writers